The  is a Japanese suburban electric multiple unit (EMU) train type introduced in 1963 by Japanese National Railways (JNR), currently operated by West Japan Railway Company (JR-West) and Shikoku Railway Company (JR Shikoku), and formerly also operated by East Japan Railway Company (JR East) and Central Japan Railway Company (JR Central).

They are used in the mild temperature areas of Japan, due to their brakes not being capable of handling cold weather. The 115 series were built to operate in colder areas.

Variants

111 series

The 111 series was a Japanese suburban electric multiple unit. Built in 1962 and 1963 for JNR, the 111 series served as a prototype of sorts for the 113 series sets that were to soon follow.

Based on the earlier 421 series, the 111 series was built as an attempt to combat the overcrowding of platforms through the use of three-door cars as opposed to two-door cars. Production of the 111 series was stopped in 1963 once production was shifted to the 113 series cars; only thirty 111 series cars were produced.

After the privatization of the JNR, the sets' ownership was taken over by JR Shikoku, which used the sets until March 2001, after which they were retired. Four cars are currently preserved; KuHa 111–1 at the SCMaglev and Railway Park in Nagoya, Japan, KuHa 111-3002 stored in JR Shikoku's Tadotsu Works and MoHa 110-1 and MoHa 111-1 stored at JR Central's Hamamatsu Works. The sectioned front ends of KuHa 111-1072 and KuHa 111-2152 are also preserved at the Poppo-no-oka farm shop in Isumi, Chiba.

113-0 series
These sets were the first of the 113 series, and were put to use on the Sobu and Yokosuka Lines. They had the same body structure as the 111 series, with only the driver's cab being extended. In 1970, AU73X, AU74X, AU75X type air conditioning was fitted experimentally to sets operated in the Kansai area. The test was successful, and hence was fitted into the majority of the cars. Production of the -0 series ceased in 1973, and most sets have now been withdrawn.

113-0 series (JR Shikoku)
Three 113-0 sets were transferred to JR Shikoku from JR East for refurbishment. Following refurbishment, they differed externally from most 113 series train sets because they had lower front destination signs and rectangular headlights. Each set also came in a different colour scheme; set 1 in a coat of lime green surrounding the windows with light blue; set 2 in red and pink; and set 3 in orange and yellow. All had a ribbon of silver on the top and bottom, and the colours were arranged in the same pattern. The last of these sets was withdrawn in 2019.

113-700 series
These sets were built for use on the Kosei Line, due to the heavy amounts of snowfall in the region. They feature semi automatic doors, snowploughs and improved brakes. Some trains were also transferred to the Sagano Line.

113-1000 series
These sets were introduced from 1972, and were an improved version of the 113–0 series, for use on the Sobu and Yokosuka Lines. They incorporated fire resistant materials, sealed beam headlights and air conditioning. These trains were used around the Boso area, on the Narita Line, Kashima Line, Sotobo Line, and Uchibo Line.

However, due to minor modifications of the ATC and air conditioning in some trains in April 1972, some of the trains from the Boso area were transferred for use on the Tokaido Line.

113-1500 series
These sets were an improvement on the 113–1000 series and these sets were all located at Ofuna. They ran on the Sobu and Yokosuka Lines and on the Tokaido Line. All 113–1500 series trains were fitted with ATC-5 and ATS-P/SN.

113-2000 series
These sets are an improvement on the 113–0 series. Some of these sets remain in service at Kosei Line and Kusatsu Line.

113-3800 series
These are JR-West 2-car sets which were converted in 2001 by building new cabs at one end of former MoHa (non-driving motor) cars.

113-5300 series

113-5800 series

113-7700 series

Livery variations

Preserved examples
 KuHa 111-1 (preserved at SCMaglev and Railway Park in Nagoya, Aichi since 2011, previously preserved at Sakuma Rail Park, Hamamatsu, Shizuoka)
 KuHa 111-3002 (preserved at JR Shikoku's Tadotsu Works) - Scrapped in December 2011
 MoHa 110-1 & MoHa 111-1 (preserved at JR Central's Hamamatsu works) - Scrapped in December 2010
 KuHa 111-1072 (front end only, preserved at Isumi, Chiba)
 KuHa 111-2152 (front end only, preserved at Isumi, Chiba)

References

Further reading

External links

 

Electric multiple units of Japan
East Japan Railway Company
Central Japan Railway Company
West Japan Railway Company
Shikoku Railway Company
Train-related introductions in 1963
Hitachi multiple units
Kinki Sharyo multiple units
Kawasaki multiple units
Kisha Seizo multiple units
Nippon Sharyo multiple units
Tokyu Car multiple units
Teikoku Sharyo rolling stock
1500 V DC multiple units of Japan